Nesticella is a genus of spiders of the family Nesticidae. Most of its species are found in Asia—from Russia to Japan, down to Indonesia and several other islands, including New Guinea—though some species from Africa and South-America are also known. It includes a blind spider, Nesticella marapu.

Species
Nesticella comprises the following species:

 Nesticella aelleni (Brignoli, 1972) – Sri Lanka
 Nesticella africana (Hubert, 1970)  – Congo
 Nesticella apiculata Liu & Li, 2013 – China
 Nesticella arcuata Liu & Li, 2013 – China
 Nesticella baiseensis Lin, Ballarin & Li, 2016
 Nesticella baobab Lin, Ballarin & Li, 2016
 Nesticella beccus Grall & Jäger, 2016 
 Nesticella benoiti (Hubert, 1970) – Zimbabwe
 Nesticella brevipes (Yaginuma, 1970)  – Russia, China, Korea, Japan
 Nesticella buicongchieni (Lehtinen & Saaristo, 1980) – Vietnam
 Nesticella caeca Lin, Ballarin & Li, 2016
 Nesticella chillagoensis Wunderlich, 1995 – Queensland
 Nesticella chongqing Lin, Ballarin & Li, 2016
 Nesticella connectens Wunderlich, 1995 – Malaysia
 Nesticella dazhuangensis Lin, Ballarin & Li, 2016 
 Nesticella ducke Rodrigues & Buckup, 2007 – Brazil
 Nesticella falcata Liu & Li, 2013 – China
 Nesticella foelixi Grall & Jäger, 2016
 Nesticella fuliangensis Lin, Ballarin & Li, 2016
 Nesticella gazuida Lin, Ballarin & Li, 2016
 Nesticella gongshanensis Lin, Ballarin & Li, 2016
 Nesticella gracilenta Liu & Li, 2013 – China
 Nesticella griswoldi Lin, Ballarin & Li, 2016
 Nesticella helenensis (Hubert, 1977) – St. Helena
 Nesticella hongheensis Lin, Ballarin & Li, 2016
 Nesticella huomachongensis Lin, Ballarin & Li, 2016
 Nesticella jingpo Lin, Ballarin & Li, 2016
 Nesticella kaohsiungensis Lin, Ballarin & Li, 2016
 Nesticella kerzhneri (Marusik, 1987) – Russia
 Nesticella laotica Grall & Jäger, 2016
 Nesticella lisu Lin, Ballarin & Li, 2016
 Nesticella liuzhaiensis Lin, Ballarin & Li, 2016
 Nesticella machadoi (Hubert, 1971) – Angola
 Nesticella marapu Benjamin, 2004 – Indonesia
 Nesticella michaliki Grall & Jäger, 2016
 Nesticella mogera (Yaginuma, 1972) – Azerbaijan, China, Korea, Japan, Hawaii, Fiji; introduced to Germany
 Nesticella mollicula (Thorell, 1898)
 Nesticella murici Rodrigues & Buckup, 2007 – Brazil
 Nesticella nandanensis Lin, Ballarin & Li, 2016
 Nesticella nepalensis (Hubert, 1973) – Nepal – type species.
 Nesticella odonta (Chen, 1984) – China
 Nesticella okinawaensis (Yaginuma, 1979) – Japan
 Nesticella phami Lin, Ballarin & Li, 2016 
 Nesticella potala Lin, Ballarin & Li, 2016
 Nesticella proszynskii (Lehtinen & Saaristo, 1980) – Java
 Nesticella qiaoqiensis Lin, Ballarin & Li, 2016
 Nesticella qiongensis Lin, Ballarin & Li, 2016
 Nesticella quelpartensis (Paik & Namkung, 1969) – Korea
 Nesticella renata (Bourne, 1980) – New Ireland
 Nesticella robinsoni Lehtinen & Saaristo, 1980 – New Guinea
 Nesticella robusta Lin, Ballarin & Li, 2016
 Nesticella rongtangensis Lin, Ballarin & Li, 2016
 Nesticella sanchaheensis Lin, Ballarin & Li, 2016
 Nesticella sechellana (Simon, 1898) – Seychelles
 Nesticella semicircularis Liu & Li, 2013 – China
 Nesticella shanlinensis Liu & Li, 2013 – China
 Nesticella sogi Lehtinen & Saaristo, 1980 – New Guinea
 Nesticella songi Chen & Zhu, 2004 – China
 Nesticella sulawesi Lin, Ballarin & Li, 2016
 Nesticella sumatrana Lin, Ballarin & Li, 2016
 Nesticella taurama Lehtinen & Saaristo, 1980 – New Guinea
 Nesticella tibetana Lin, Ballarin & Li, 2016
 Nesticella utuensis (Bourne, 1980) – New Ireland
 Nesticella vanlang Lin, Ballarin & Li, 2016
 Nesticella verticalis Liu & Li, 2013 – China
 Nesticella wanzaiensis Lin, Ballarin & Li, 2016
 Nesticella xiongmao Lin, Ballarin & Li, 2016
 Nesticella xixia Lin, Ballarin & Li, 2016
 Nesticella yanbeiensis Lin, Ballarin & Li, 2016
 Nesticella yao Lin, Ballarin & Li, 2016
 Nesticella yui Wunderlich & Song, 1995 – China
 Nesticella zhiyuani Lin, Ballarin & Li, 2016

References
  (2009): The world spider catalog, version 10.5. American Museum of Natural History.

Nesticidae
Spiders of Asia
Spiders of Africa
Spiders of South America
Araneomorphae genera
Taxa named by Pekka T. Lehtinen